Austin A90 may refer to:
 Austin A90 Atlantic
 Austin Westminster

A90